is a 2012 Japanese horror film directed by Kazuyoshi Hayashi.

Cast
Ami Yokota as Tomoko Takayanagi
Nako Mizusawa as Miu Kuroe

References

External links
Official website  

2012 horror films
Japanese horror films
2012 films
2010s Japanese films